Watt Ridge is a ridge, 7 nautical miles (13 km) long, extending northwest from Mount Llano in the Prince Olav Mountains and terminating at the east side of Barrett Glacier. Named by Advisory Committee on Antarctic Names (US-ACAN) for Lieutenant Commander Robert C. Watt, U.S. Navy, Supply Officer during U.S. Navy Operation Deepfreeze 1964.

Ridges of the Ross Dependency
Dufek Coast